Lasionycta subalpina is a moth of the family Noctuidae. It is found from southern Idaho and the Beartooth Plateau on the Montana-Wyoming border to Colorado and central Utah as well as in the Sierra Nevada of California.

The habitat is subalpine forests and mid-elevation pine forests.

The wingspan is 29–33 mm for males and 30–35 mm for females. Adults are on wing from mid-July through August.

External links
A Revision of Lasionycta Aurivillius (Lepidoptera, Noctuidae) for North America and notes on Eurasian species, with descriptions of 17 new species, 6 new subspecies, a new genus, and two new species of Tricholita Grote

Lasionycta
Moths described in 2009